Below is a partial list of populated places in Vanuatu.

Populated places 

Avire
Bunlap
Butmas
Forari
Ipikil
Ipota
Isangel
Lakatoro
Lamap
Loltong
Longana
Lorevilko
Luganville
Lenakel
Norsup
Port Olry
Port Vila - Capital
Rovo Bay
Sola
Sulphur Bay
Whitesands

References 

Vanuatu
 
Cities
Vanuatu
Vanuatu